Henry Lomb ( – ) was a German-American optician who co-founded Bausch & Lomb (with John Jacob Bausch) and led a group of businessmen to found The Mechanics Institute, the forerunner of Rochester Institute of Technology.

Biography 
Lomb was born in Burghaun, Hessen-Kassel (or Hessen-Cassel), Germany. He emigrated to the United States in 1849 and settled in Rochester, New York, where he worked as a cabinet-maker.

When his friend, John Jacob Bausch, the owner of a retail optical shop in Rochester, needed  additional capital in 1854, he loaned him $60 on Bausch's promise that, if the business ever grew to such an extent that he needed a partner, Lomb would be brought in. The business did grow and together they formed the Bausch & Lomb Company.

Lomb enlisted in the 13th New York Volunteer Infantry and fought in the American Civil War as sergeant, lieutenant and captain. When the war ended, he left the military and returned to the company.

In 1885, Lomb, along with Max Lowenthal, Ezra R. Andrews, Frank Ritter, William F. Peck and others, founded the Mechanics Institute (now Rochester Institute of Technology), whose mission was to offer "education for making a living." Lomb served as chairman of the Institute Board until 1891, and continued to be a strong supporter of the school until his death.

Henry Lomb died suddenly in Pittsford, New York at the age of 79. He is buried in Mount Hope Cemetery in Rochester.

Legacy 
The following have been named in Henry Lomb's honor:
World War II Liberty Ship SS Henry Lomb, hull number 1784
Henry Lomb School, elementary school #20 in Rochester, New York
Lomb Memorial Drive and the Bausch & Lomb Center, both on the campus of the Rochester Institute of Technology

References

External links 

1828 births
1908 deaths
American Civil War industrialists
Burials at Mount Hope Cemetery (Rochester)
Hessian emigrants to the United States
Businesspeople from Rochester, New York
American opticians
People from Pittsford, New York